Anton Alekseyevich Matveyev (born 1 May 1987) is a former Russian professional football player.

Club career
He played in the Moldovan National Division for FC Politehnica Chişinău in the 2007–08 season.

External links
 

1987 births
People from Kamyshin
Living people
Russian footballers
Association football midfielders
FC Energiya Volzhsky players
FC Dynamo Stavropol players
FC Taganrog players
FC Saturn Ramenskoye players
Moldovan Super Liga players
Russian expatriate footballers
Expatriate footballers in Moldova
Russian expatriate sportspeople in Moldova
Sportspeople from Volgograd Oblast